"All Over Again" is the first single released from Irish singer-songwriter Ronan Keating's fourth solo album, Bring You Home (2006). The song, which features guest vocals from folk singer Kate Rusby, was produced by Mark Taylor and written by Don Mescall and Randy Goodrum. The song peaked at number six on the UK Singles Chart while also reaching number 20 in Ireland and number 33 in Italy.

Track listings
UK CD1
 "All Over Again" – 3:58
 "Life Is a Rollercoaster" – 3:55

UK CD2
 "All Over Again" – 3:58
 "Heaven" – 3:17
 "Back on Your Feet Again" – 3:51
 "All Over Again" (video)

Charts

Weekly charts

Year-end charts

References

Ronan Keating songs
2006 singles
Polydor Records singles
Song recordings produced by Mark Taylor (record producer)
Songs written by Don Mescall
Songs written by Randy Goodrum